is a passenger railway station located in the city of Hannō, Saitama, Japan, operated by the private railway operator Seibu Railway.

Lines

Station layout
The station consists of one island platform serving two tracks, connected to the station building by a level crossing.

History
It was renamed to its present name on 1 March 1933.

Station numbering was introduced on all Seibu Railway lines during fiscal 2012, with Higashi-Agano Station becoming "SI30".

Passenger statistics
In fiscal 2019, the station was the 88th busiest on the Seibu network with an average of 456 passengers daily.

The passenger figures for previous years are as shown below.

Surrounding area
 
Higashi-Agano Post Office

See also
 List of railway stations in Japan

References

External links

 Seibu Railway station information

Railway stations in Saitama Prefecture
Railway stations in Japan opened in 1929
Seibu Ikebukuro Line
Hannō